Paris Connections is a 2010 British film directed by Harley Cokeliss. The script was written by Michael Tupy, based on a thriller by Jackie Collins. The film was the first direct to DVD film that the British supermarket firm Tesco produced, when trying to diversify its business.

Plot 
At the beginning of Paris fashion week, a beautiful young model is brutally murdered. Investigative journalist Madison Castelli, certain that it is more than the "crime of passion" the French press says, comes to Paris to follow her story.

Cast 
 Nicole Steinwedell as Madison Castelli
 Charles Dance as Aleksandr Borinski
 Anthony Delon as Jake Sica
 Hudson Leick as Coco De Ville
 Trudie Styler as Olivia Hayes
 Anouk Aimée as Agnès St. Clair
 Chloé Dumas as Candi
 Caroline Chikezie as Natalie
 Fabien De Chalvron as Sergei

References

External links 

2010 films
British thriller films
Films directed by Harley Cokeliss
Films set in France
Films set in Paris
Films shot in Paris
2010s English-language films
2010s British films